Imavere is a village in Järva County in central Estonia. It was the administrative center of Imavere Parish.

References

Villages in Järva County
Kreis Fellin